Contra 4 is a 2D action game published by Konami Digital Entertainment in the United States and developed by WayForward Technologies. It is the eleventh overall installment of the Contra series, and was released in North America on November 13, 2007 for Nintendo DS. A mobile port was released six days later on November 19, 2007.

Contra 4 serves as a direct sequel to 1992's Contra III: The Alien Wars for Super NES, in celebration of the 20th anniversary of the franchise. It was the first Contra game released on a portable platform since 1991's Operation C for Game Boy.

Plot
The plot is set two years after the events of Contra III: The Alien Wars. Following the defeat of Red Falcon, a new entity called "Black Viper" begins launching attacks against the human race. Bill Rizer and Lance Bean are joined by Mad Dog and Scorpion as they travel to the fictional Galuga archipelago near New Zealand (the setting of the original arcade version of Contra.) on a "final" strike mission. 

The game's producers took a number of liberties with the established canon. In the North American versions, Black Viper was originally the name of the main antagonist in Operation C, while "Mad Dog" and "Scorpion" were the codenames of Bill and Lance.

Gameplay

Contra 4 is based on the same 2D gameplay featured in the series through Contra III: The Alien Wars, ignoring many of the game mechanics introduced in later games, and returning to the old method of picking up power-up icons to obtain new weapons. The play controls are similar to Contra III, including the ability to hold two weapons in the player's inventory. The action spans both screens of the Nintendo DS system and a grappling hook can be used by the player's character to latch onto railings, allowing the player's character to move from one screen to the other. Similarly to the arcade version of Super Contra, the player can pick up the same power-up twice, giving them an improved version of the same weapon. The player can also discard a power-up, allowing them to try out a new weapon without losing a previous one.

In addition to the standard side view stages, there are also tunnel stages similar to the two "3D view" stages from the original Contra, in which the perspective shifts behind the character's back. The action in these stages is displayed solely on the upper screen, while the bottom screen is used to display the stage's map and the locations of power-ups. Other than using both screens, Contra 4 makes no usage of the DS' special features such as the touchscreen (besides navigating the main menu), microphone, or multiplayer modes.

Arcade Mode
Arcade Mode is the main portion of the game, which is composed of six standard stages and three tunnel stages, for a total of nine stages. The stages pay frequent homage to Contra, Super Contra (Super C on the NES), Operation C and Contra III: The Alien Wars. Three difficulty settings are available: Easy, Normal, and Hard. Easy is intended to be accessible to novices by providing the player with plenty of lives and credits, as well as making all power-ups upgraded by default, but does not give the player access to the final two stages nor the ending. Normal is a moderate setting described to be "as difficult as the original Contra", whereas Hard features faster-moving enemies and enemy fire, with fewer lives. Hard mode also features a different ending from Normal.

Challenge Mode
After completing the main game (Arcade Mode) once on any difficulty setting, a Challenge Mode will be made available in the main menu. This game mode is composed of forty different challenges in which the player must complete various tasks within the side-scrolling stages of Arcade Mode.

Music
The music and sound effects were handled by famed video game music remixer Jake Kaufman, who also composed for Shantae and founded the game music remix site VGMix. The soundtrack consists of a few arrangements of music from previous Contra games as well as new material. When Arcade Mode is played on the Hard setting, an arranged version of the Jungle theme from the original Contra is played instead of the standard stage music. The standard Jungle theme is actually an enhanced version of a "Contra style" chiptune song previously posted on Kaufman's website, called "Vile Red Falcon."

A soundtrack CD was announced by Konami to be bundled in the first print of the Japanese release of Contra: Dual Spirits, as a gift for preorders through the KonamiStyle shop. This deal was only available for Japanese residents. In addition to the music found in the game, a 4-minute live performance of the "Harbor" song is included as a bonus track. The song is performed by The Smash Bros, Jake Kaufman's video game tribute band.

Reception

Contra 4 received positive reviews from critics, scoring an 83 out of 100 on Metacritic. Contra 4 has been hailed as a "rebirth" of the franchise, and was praised for returning to its roots. It has garnered multiple awards including IGN's "Best Action Game" and "Best Revival" of 2007, and GameSpy's 7th best DS game of 2007. GamesRadar+ named Contra 4 the 22nd best DS game of all time out of a list of 25.

Notes

References

External links
Official website via Internet Archive
Contra 4 at MobyGames
Contra 4 at GameFAQs
Contra 4 at IGN

2007 video games
Interquel video games
Mobile games
Nintendo DS games
Contra (series)
Video game prequels
Video game sequels
Video games scored by Jake Kaufman
Video games developed in the United States
Cooperative video games
Video games set in the 27th century
Video games with alternate endings
WayForward games
Multiplayer and single-player video games